Places known as Elberton:

Elberton, Georgia, USA
Elberton, Montserrat
Elberton, Gloucestershire, England
Elberton, Washington, USA